Ezmareh-ye Olya (also Romanized as Ez̧māreh-ye ‘Olyā; also known as Az̧māreh and Ez̧māreh-ye Bālā) is a village in Ani Rural District, in the Central District of Germi County, Ardabil Province, Iran. At the 2006 census, its population was 800, in 171 families.

References 

Towns and villages in Germi County